Sumatra earthquake may refer to:

1797 Sumatra earthquake
1833 Sumatra earthquake
1861 Sumatra earthquake
1931 Southwest Sumatra earthquake
1933 Sumatra earthquake
1935 Sumatra earthquake
1984 Northern Sumatra earthquake
2002 Sumatra earthquake
March 2007 Sumatra earthquakes
September 2007 Sumatra earthquakes
2009 Sumatra earthquakes
April 2010 Sumatra earthquake
May 2010 Northern Sumatra earthquake
2016 Sumatra earthquake
2022 Sumatra earthquake

See also
1943 Alahan Panjang earthquakes
2000 Enggano earthquake
2004 Indian Ocean earthquake and tsunami
2005 Nias–Simeulue earthquake
2008 Simeulue earthquake
2011 Aceh Singkil Regency earthquakes
2013 Aceh earthquake
2016 Aceh earthquake
List of earthquakes in Indonesia